Dominic Anthony "Tony" Antonelli (born August 23, 1967) is a retired NASA astronaut. Antonelli was born in Detroit, Michigan, but was raised in both Indiana and North Carolina. He is married and has two children.

Education
Antonelli graduated from Douglas Byrd High School in Fayetteville, North Carolina. He went on to attend the Massachusetts Institute of Technology, where he earned a Bachelor of Science in aeronautics and astronautics. He later attended the University of Washington, earning a Master of Science in aeronautics and astronautics.

Military career
Antonelli served as a fleet Naval Aviator and Landing Signal Officer aboard the aircraft carrier  with the Blue Diamonds (VFA-146), flying F/A-18C Hornets in support of Operation Southern Watch.

Antonelli has accumulated over 3,200 hours in 41 different kinds of aircraft and has completed 273 carrier arrested landings. He is a Distinguished Graduate of the U.S. Air Force Test Pilot School (Navy Exchange Pilot).

NASA career
Selected as an astronaut candidate by NASA in July 2000, Antonelli served in various technical assignments until his assignment to a mission. He served as pilot on the STS-119 mission which launched on March 15, 2009. The flight delivered the final pair of power-generating solar array wings and truss element to the International Space Station. Antonelli was assigned as pilot on the STS-132 mission, launched on May 14, 2010. The mission saw the delivery of the Russian Mini-Research Module 1 (MRM-1) to the International Space Station.

Awards and honors
Navy Meritorious Service Medal
Navy Commendation Medal
Navy Achievement Medals (2)
Unit Battle Efficiency Awards (2)
CVW-9 Landing Signal Officer of the Year
NASA Exceptional Achievement Medal
NASA Superior Accomplishment Award
NASA Return-to-Flight Award

References

External links

 NASA bio
 Spacefacts biography of Dominic A. Antonelli

1967 births
Living people
United States Navy astronauts
MIT School of Engineering alumni
University of Washington College of Engineering alumni
U.S. Air Force Test Pilot School alumni
United States Navy officers
United States Naval Aviators
Recipients of the NASA Exceptional Achievement Medal
Space Shuttle program astronauts
Recipients of the Meritorious Service Medal (United States)